Events from the year 1643 in France

Incumbents
 Monarch – Louis XIII (until 14 May); then Louis XIV
Regent: Anne of Austria (from 14 May)

Events

14 May – Louis XIII dies, and Louis XIV becomes King of France.
19 May – Battle of Rocroi

Births

Full date missing
Jean Chapelain, traveler (died 1713)
Louis Moréri, priest and encyclopedist (died 1680)
Henri Jules, Prince of Condé (died 1709)

Deaths
14 May – Louis XIII of France (born 1601)

Full date missing
Pierre Hérigone, mathematician and astronomer (born 1580)
Jean du Vergier de Hauranne, Catholic priest (born 1581)
Henri Spondanus, jurist and historian (born 1568)
Étienne de la Croix, Jesuit missionary and writer (born 1579)

See also

References

1640s in France